The 1941 Western Ontario Mustangs football team represented the University of Western Ontario as an independent during the 1941 college football season. The team was led by second-year head coach Johnny Metras. The Mustangs had previously played Canadian college football, but the intercollegiate sport was suspended in Canada due to the war.  In order to keep the program alive, Coach Metras decided to compete with American college teams in 1941 playing by American rules.

Prior to the start of the 1941 season, Western Ontario had not lost a game in two years against Canadian opponents.  During the 1941 season, the team compiled a 1–4 record against American teams.

The 1941 Western Ontario team included only one American player, John "Bomber" Douglas of Detroit. Joe Krol scored three touchdowns for the Mustangs in their November 1 game.

Schedule

References

Western Ontario
Western Mustangs football seasons
Western Ontario Mustangs footbal